Christine Tsung (born 1948) is a Taiwanese business executive and politician.

Career
Tsung earned an MBA from the University of Missouri and worked in the United States prior to joining China Airlines in 2000 as president of the company. In December 2001, China Airlines and Delta Air Lines signed a marketing agreement. Yu Shyi-kun offered her a position as Minister of Economic Affairs in January 2002, which Tsung initially turned down. She succeeded Lin Hsin-i as the first female economics minister in Taiwanese history on 1 February 2002, only to resign on 20 March. During her short tenure as head of the economics ministry, Tsung was widely ridiculed during interpellation sessions.

Shortly after leaving the Executive Yuan, Tsung became chairwoman of the Grand Hotel in Taipei. She was replaced by Chang Shuo-lao in 2008.

Personal life
Tsung is married to banker Jerome Chen.

References

1948 births
Living people
Taiwanese people from Jiangsu
Republic of China politicians from Jiangsu
Taiwanese women business executives
Taiwanese Ministers of Economic Affairs
China Airlines
University of Missouri alumni
Women government ministers of Taiwan
Taiwanese business executives
20th-century businesswomen
20th-century Taiwanese businesspeople
21st-century businesswomen
21st-century Taiwanese businesspeople